The 2006 Møbelringen Cup was held in Hamar, Gjøvik and Lillehammer, Norway. The tournament started on 24 November 2006 and finished on 26 November. Norway won the event by winning all their matches. Russia who also won their first two matches, was beaten in the last match of the tournament, when Norway won by 29-26.

After Norway won the tournament, Norway's coach Marit Breivik had to decline suggestions that Norway were favourites for the European Championships in December. Regardless, Norwegian newspaper Aftenposten said that Russia were no longer the major favourites for the EC.

Results

24 November 2006, Hamar

25 November 2006, Gjøvik

26 November 2006, Lillehammer

All-Star Team 

Goalkeeper:  
Left Wing:   
Back Player: 
Back Player: 
Back Player: 
Right Wing:  
Line Player:

References

External links
Reports at handball-feminin.be

Moebelringen Cup
2006
2006 in Norwegian sport